Pomade (French pommade) or pomatum is a greasy, waxy, or water-based substance that is used to style hair.  Pomade generally gives the user's hair a shiny and slick appearance. It lasts longer than most  hair-care products, and often requires multiple washes for complete removal. The pomades of the eighteenth and nineteenth centuries consisted mainly of bear fat or lard. Lanolin, beeswax, and petroleum jelly have been used extensively in the manufacture of modern pomades. The hold of pomades makes sculptured hairstyles such as the  pompadour  waves (hairstyle)  possible.

Origin of the name
The English word "pomade" is derived from French pommade meaning "ointment", itself arising from the Latin pomum (fruit, apple) via the Italian pomata or pomo (meaning "apple"—as the original ointment recipe contained mashed apples).  Modern pomades may contain fragrances, but they are usually not particularly fruity.

History

During the Roman era, soap was used as a pomade by some European tribes. In the 19th century, bear fat was usually the main pomade ingredient.  In 1873 UK company Morgan's Pomade was established selling Hair Darkening Pomade across the world. By the early 20th century, petroleum jelly, beeswax, and lard were more commonly used.  Early 20th century examples of pomades include Murray's Superior Pomade (originating in 1925), Sweet Georgia Brown Hair Dressing Pomade (originating in 1934) and Royal Crown Pomade (originating in 1936).  Dixie Peach Hair Pomade was popular with teenage boys in the U.S. from World War II through the 1960s.

Pomades were much more popular in the 1920s to 1950s than they are today, although they have made a comeback in the 2010s with recent alternations to the marketplace, which feature not only traditionally manufactured petroleum and oil-based pomades but also modern water-soluble pomades. Compared to oil-based pomades, water-based pomades wash out more easily.

Hairstyles from the 20th and 21st centuries involving the use of pomade include the ducktail, pompadour, and quiff. The Pompadour was a cultural phenomenon in the mid-1950s to 1964 and was worn by young actors and those in the new musical genre, Rock and Roll. Examples can be seen on Elvis Presley, Chuck Berry and James Dean. In the 1980s, Rockabilly style Rock and Roll and the pompadour had a resurgence and was worn by musicians such as Brian Setzer and Chris Isaak.

Modern resurgence 
The reemergence of popular pomade use coincides with the rise in popularity of the disconnected undercut hairstyle. The hairstyle is characterized by buzzed or faded sides, and a much longer top which is disconnected from the side hairs. The undercut hairstyle was first popularized in the early 20th century as affordable barbershops used the newly invented hair clipper to quickly and cheaply shave the sides of men's heads; leaving long top hairs that would be  styled with pomade. During the 2010s, the style was featured in many popular period movies, especially World War II films, and in shows such as Peaky Blinders. Celebrities such as athlete  David Beckham and actor Brad Pitt were seen donning this style of hair. 

The heavy hold and slick look of pomade is very well suited to control the long hair of most undercut styles.

Today's pomades fall under two main categories with some subcategories, the traditional oil-based pomade and the newer water-based and gel pomades.

Traditional oil-based pomades are generally subdivided into three more groups: heavy hold, medium hold, and light hold. Heavier pomades generally have a higher wax content and better hold their shape throughout the day. The higher wax content usually results in a lower shine pomade. Light holds, sometimes called a brilliantine, have a higher oil content and therefore are usually more shiny. This type of pomade has a wet look and a lower hold. Some prominent modern oil-based pomades are Reuzel, Lockhart's, and Murray's. 

The water-based pomades are split between gel-based pomades (Orthodox) and water-based (Unorthodox) pomades. Gel pomades come in different degrees of hold. Firm hold pomades dry much more stiff and are better at holding a particular style. However, they are generally less malleable and can only be restyled during the day by wetting the hair. These pomades generally contain hardening agents such as polyvinyl pyrolidone or vinyl pyrolidone. Some popular gel pomades include Suavecito, 
Layrite and Imperial. 

Unorthodox water-based pomades mimic the malleable qualities of oil-based pomades while still being able to be easily washed out like a gel pomade. Popular unorthodox water-based pomades include O'Douds, Shear Revival, Lockharts, and Flagship pomades.

Pomade community 

The rise in popularity of pomade led to the emergence of an online pomade community. The online pomade community is centered around YouTube, Etsy, and Reddit. YouTube channels centering around pomades and hair culture center around reviewing different pomades and discussing hair styling tips. Some prominent YouTube channels such as The Pomp have released their own lines of pomade. The Reddit community is a much more interactive space where members of the community can ask about other users opinions on certain pomades. Members also sell and trade pomades with each other on this site. Etsy is home to micro-brewers of pomades. The term micro-brewer in the pomade world refers to small handmade operations that sell online. The ease of creating pomade and the ready availability of traditional pomade materials allows for a low barrier of entry into the pomade industry.

Use

Unlike hair spray and hair gel, pomade does not dry, keeps the hairstyle flexible and can last much longer. Pomade is used to style hair (including mustaches, sideburns, and beards), giving it a darker, slicker, shinier look, and is often associated with the slick men's hairstyles of the early to mid-20th century. Because of its greasy or waxy nature, pomade can last through several washings, although it is easily removed using de-greasers such as high-detergent shampoos, dishwashing liquids, or any shampoos designed for oily hair. Due to the difficulty of washing pomade out of the hair, water-based and water-soluble pomades were introduced to the market and feature fewer wax substances. These products are more easily washable but often do not give the same versatility, shine, and strength of hold offered by the traditional petrolatum-based products.

Some pomade products, such as mustache wax, are marketed for a specific use, while products such as Ultra Sheen, are marketed for specific consumers. Pomade is often used with Afro-textured hair to keep it from drying out. All these products come in various textures and consistencies, and essentially achieve the same effect as either hair wax or pomade.

Difference between hair wax and pomade

Traditionally, the difference between hair wax and pomade was that pomade gave the hair a slicker, shinier appearance, while wax gave a looser, more texturized and matte finish. Today the difference between pomade and hair wax is becoming somewhat ambiguous especially since many heavier pomades contain beeswax. Hair wax and pomade are closely related, however, with pliability their main common property. This differentiates both wax and pomade from gel and hairspray, both of which are not designed to be restyled once the product is applied.

See also
Beard oil
Brilliantine
Brylcreem

References

Sources
 

Hairdressing
Hair care products